Silvio Cássio Bernardo (São Paulo, 10 of July 1967), better known as Silvetty Montilla, is a Brazilian drag queen, actor, comedian, television presenter and reporter considered one of the greatest artists of Brazil's LGBT culture.  Over more than thirty-five years of career, Montilla has acted in several theatre plays, performed regularly in the main São Paulo gay clubs and participated in television programs. Currently, besides acting in musical pieces, he works in comedy clubs and in 2015 has launched his own stand-up comedy piece. He is also ahead of the reality show "Academia de Drags" (Drags Academy) on Youtube.

References

External links

 

1967 births
People from São Paulo
Brazilian drag queens
Living people